The FIS Nordic World Ski Championships 1995 took place 9–19 March 1995 in Thunder Bay, Ontario, Canada. This marked the second time the separate championships (not part of Winter Olympics) were held outside Europe (the first was in the US towns of Lake Placid, New York, and Rumford, Maine, in 1950). The Nordic combined team event was changed from a 3 × 10 km relay to a 4 × 5 km relay for these championships.

Men's cross-country

10 km classical 
11 March 1995

10 km + 15 km combined pursuit 
13 March 1995

30 km classical 
9 March 1995

50 km  freestyle 
19 March 1995

This marks the first recorded time the 50 km was completed in under two hours.

4 × 10 km relay
17 March 1995

Women's cross-country

5 km classical 
12 March 1995

5 km + 10 km combined pursuit 
14 March 1995

15 km classical 
10 March 1995

30 km freestyle 
18 March 1995

4 × 5 km relay
17 March 1995

Men's Nordic combined

15 km individual Gundersen
9 March 1995

4 × 5 km team
10 March 1995

Men's ski jumping

Individual normal hill 
12 March 1995

Individual large hill 
18 March 1995

Team large hill
16 March 1995

Medal table
Medal winners by nation.
The host country, Canada, did not get any medals.

References
FIS 1995 cross-country results
FIS 1995 Nordic combined results
FIS 1995 ski jumping results

FIS Nordic World Ski Championships
International sports competitions hosted by Canada
Sports competitions in Thunder Bay
1995 in Nordic combined
1995 in Canadian sports
1995 in Ontario
March 1995 sports events in Canada
Nordic skiing competitions in Canada